Peter Honess (born 1946) is an English film editor with more than thirty film credits dating from 1973. Honess received the 1997 BAFTA Award for Best Editing for his work on L.A. Confidential.

Biography
Honess was educated at Queen's College, Taunton from 1956-1963. He then became an apprentice editor at the United Kingdom branch of MGM, where his father was working. He moved to the United States in 1971, where he received his first editing credit for It's Alive! (1974), a cult horror film about a couple that become parents of a monster baby. When Honess returned to the United Kingdom, he was again employed as an assistant editor. In all, Honess spent fifteen years as an assistant. Honess acknowledges the mentoring by British editors Tony Gibbs (Tom Jones) and Thelma Connell (Alfie), "Thelma was quite an extraordinary woman. I was absorbed by how she edited. She cut very, very fast. That was also true of Tony. He'd cut the film in his head at dailies." After a ten-year hiatus, Honess was hired to edit the films Memed, My Hawk (1984) and Champion (1984), and thereafter he has worked regularly as an editor.

Honess's recent filmography includes Rob Roy (1995), L.A. Confidential (1997), The Next Best Thing (2000), Harry Potter and the Chamber of Secrets (2002), Troy (2004), Aeon Flux (2005), Poseidon (2006), The Golden Compass (2007), I Love You, Beth Cooper (2008), Percy Jackson and the Olympians (2009), Burlesque (Cher's performance - 2010), Romeo & Juliet (2012), and Words and Pictures (2013).

Awards 
Honess was nominated for an ACE Eddie Award for documentary editing for Following the Tundra Wolf (1974). In addition to its BAFTA Award for Best Editing, L. A. Confidential was also nominated for an Academy Award for Best Film Editing, an ACE Eddie Award, and the Satellite Award. The film was also included in a 2012 listing of the 75 best edited films of all time compiled by the Motion Picture Editors Guild based on a survey of its members. Honess has been elected to membership in the American Cinema Editors.

Filmography

References

Further reading

1945 births
Living people
American Cinema Editors
British film editors
Best Editing BAFTA Award winners
People educated at Queen's College, Taunton